Mithu Mukherjee is a former Indian actress who appeared in Hindi as well as Bengali cinema. She made her debut in a 1971 Bengali film Shesh Parba directed by Chitta Bose. She was catapulted to stardom after she had donned the role of Marjina in Dinen Gupta's Marjina Abdulla (1973) and sustained it with further roles in Bengali films such as Nishi Kanya (1973), Mouchak (1974), Swayamsiddha (1975), Hotel Snow Fox (1976), Bhagyachakra (1980) and Sandhi (1980). She made her Bollywood debut with Dulal Guha's Khaan Dost (1976). After her Dujane (1984) had tanked at the box office, she took a sabbatical of seven years and returned to silver screen with Chandra Barot's hugely successful commercial drama Ashrita (1990).

Career
Mukherjee made her debut in 1971 Bengali hit film Shesh Parba opposite Samit Bhanja directed by Chitta Bose. She was catapulted to stardom after she had donned the role of Marjina, a perspicacious maid of Ali Baba, in Dinen Gupta's Blockbuster Marjina Abdulla (1972) opposite Debraj Roy which was a remarkable grosser at box office. She was, then featured in Ashutosh Mukherjee's Nishikanya (1973) opposite Soumitra Chattopadhyay.
In 1974, her only venture was Arabinda Mukhopadhyay's Blockbuster Mouchak opposite Ranjit Mallick which was again a major grosser at box office. Her next venture was in the year 1975 , Sunil Bandopadhyay's Kabi opposite Debraj Roy for the second time which failed to create ripples at box office. The Blockbuster  Swayamsiddha opposite Ranjit Mallick again which was her last release of that year, was once again a major grosser at box office. Her career faced a major setback when two of her high profile movies of 1976 Hotel Snow Fox and Chander Kachhakachhi flopped in spite of having Uttam Kumar in the main lead although not as hero. Biju Phukan played her hero in the former while Santu Mukherjee played her hero in the later. She made her Bollywood debut with Dulal Guha's Khaan Dost (1976) opposite Shatrughan Sinha that also starred Raj kapoor in a pivotal role, but limited herself to Basu Chatterjee's films only. Mukherjee starred in Safed Jhoot (1977) opposite Vinod Mehra. Both her Bollywood movies as lead did not do well at the Box office. In 1977 she played the first wife of Soumitra Chatterjee in Palash Bandopadhyay's Super hit Bengali Film Pratima while the second wife, the titular role being played by Sumitra Mukherjee. Made on a shoe string budget of only Rs. 3.30 lakh, the movie garnered Rs. 10 lakh in the Box Office. In 1978 she was only seen in two Hindi movies directed by Basu Chatterjee namely Dillagi where she was again cast opposite Shatrughan Sinha and Do Ladke Dono Kadke opposite Navin Nischol but both failed to propel her career in Bollywood further in spite of Dillagi having Dharmendra and Hema Malini in main lead. Throughout 1979 and 1980 she starred in Bengali family dramas like Bhagya Chakra, Bandhan and Sandhi which were just average grosser although Sandhi did an above average business. Her only release in 1981 was the Bengali movie Father where she played a deaf mute rape victim opposite Subhendu Chattopadhyay where she was noted by critics alongside an ensemble cast consisting of Soumitra Chattopadhyay, Sumitra Mukherjee, Ranjit Mallick and Mahua Roychowdhury amongst others. In 1982 she acted in Dinen Gupta directed Oriya movie Jwain Pua opposite Uttam Mohanty which was a remake of her Bengali Blockbuster film Mouchak. Her next release Dujane in 1983 tanked miserably at the box office. After a one song two scenes guest appearance in 1984 movie Prarthana , Mukherjee started shooting for her home production Ranga Bhanga Chand based on Pratibha Basu's novel of the same name in 1984 under the direction of Dinen Gupta. The shooting was 50% completed and was being readied for a release in 1985 when the shooting stopped midway due to differences between Mukherjee and Gupta. The release was delayed by five years as the movie was left in the cans and later revived with Chandra Barot as director. At release Ranga Bhanga Chand was renamed Ashrita. In 1990, upon release Ashrita opposite Kanwaljit Singh gained a Super-hit status as the movie which was made on a budget of Rs. 30 lakhs grossed Rs. 3 crore at the Box Office. Ashrita was the last release of Mukherjee since when she was never seen on silver screen ever.

Filmography

References

External links
 

Living people
20th-century Indian actresses
Actresses from Kolkata
Actresses in Bengali cinema
Indian film actresses
Year of birth missing (living people)